Robert Lee Newton (born August 16, 1949) is a former American football guard in the NFL from 1971 to 1981.

High school

Newton was voted most improved player his junior year and "most valuable lineman" and All-League defensive tackle his senior year at John Glenn High School. He was coached by head coach Ray Mooshagian.In 1967 Newton played on the first annual Southern California 605 high school All Star Football game.

College

Newton went to Cerritos Junior College in Norwalk Ca. for two years and then received a scholarship from the University of Nebraska.  He was recruited by Nebraska assistant coach Tom Osborne and was one of the first recruits to attend Nebraska from California. His first season was 1969 and the Cornhuskers went 9-2 and were Big Eight Co-champions and Sun Bowl Champions. In 1970 Newton was a member of the undefeated Nebraska team that won the 1970 National Championship by beating Louisiana State University 17–12 in the Orange Bowl. Head football coach for Nebraska was Bob Devaney.

During Newton's time at Nebraska, he was a Unanimous All-Big 8 offensive tackle in 1970, Consensus All-American Offensive Tackle in 1970, and a member of Nebraska's national championship team in 1970. He set a Nebraska and Big 8 record in 1970  being nominated by Nebraska four times for Big Eight lineman of the week. Coach Devaney stated in 1970, Huskermax.com 'Bob Newton is a great offensive lineman'.' He's big, and he's got good quickness'. 'He's one of the most aggressive lineman we've ever had at Nebraska'.

 He was a 1989 inductee to the Nebraska football Hall of Fame and a 2014 inductee into the California Junior College football Hall of Fame. He was selected to the All-Century Nebraska football team in 2000. He was chosen as one of the all-time top 48 players of University of Nebraska by Bleacher Report in 2013. He was also selected by Huskers Online as one of the top four offensive tackles in the history of Nebraska football. He played in the 1971 Senior Bowl, the 1971 Coaches All-American game, and the 1971 College All-Star game against Super Bowl Champion Baltimore Colts.  In 2023   yardbarker.com namned Newton as one of the 25 best players in Nebraska football history.

Professional career

Newton played for the Chicago Bears from 1971 to 1975 and with Pro Football Hall of Fame players Dick Butkus, Gale Sayers and Walter Payton. He played for the Seattle Seahawks from 1976 to 1981 with Hall of Famer Steve Largent.  Newton was on the 1976 Seattle Seahawks expansion team that got the franchise started. He was a third round draft selection of the Chicago Bears and was moved from offensive tackle to guard his rookie year. He was named 1980 Seahawks Lineman of the Year. In 1983 Newton had brief playing experiences with the Boston Breakers and Chicago Blitz of the USFL, but his chemical dependency illness forced him to leave both teams.

Post football career

July 1983 Newton entered Valley General Hospital treatment center in Monroe, Wa. for chemical dependency.  After treatment he went back to the University of Nebraska to finish his education and in 1986 he began working in the chemical dependency field. He received his Master's degree from Capella University in 2005. He has over 30 years experience as a counselor, educator, administrator and professional speaker. Newton previously worked for the Betty Ford center for many years as  lead counselor and director. He also served as lead relapse prevention facilitator for the Young Adult Track at the Betty Ford Center.

References

1949 births
Living people
All-American college football players
American football offensive linemen
Cerritos Falcons football players
Nebraska Cornhuskers football players
Chicago Bears players
Seattle Seahawks players
Chicago Blitz players